William or Liam or Bill Ahern may refer to:
 Bill Ahern (footballer, born 1865) (1865–1938), Australian rules footballer for Carlton
 Bill Ahern (footballer, born 1874) (1874–1920), Australian rules footballer for St Kilda
 Liam Ahern (1916–1974), also known as William Ahern, Irish Fianna Fáil politician
 William Ahern (Medal of Honor) (1861–1916), sailor
 Will Ahern (1896–1983), vaudeville entertainer

See also 
 William Ahearn (1858–1919), baseball player
 William Ahearn (born 1946), astronomy benefactor after whom the asteroid 25943 Billahearn is named